Underarms and Sideways is a 2005 compilation album by The Hope Blister. It contains their 1999 album Underarms, a collection of mostly instrumental outtakes from the sessions for their first album, ...smile's OK, as well as a disc of remixes of those outtakes, Sideways, created by musician Markus Guentner.

Track listing

Disc 1 (Underarms)
 Sweet Medicine (7:47)
 Friday Afternoon (6:40)
 Iota (2:29)
 Dagger Strings (2:01)
 White On White (4:03)
 Sweet Medicine 2 (13:40)
 Happiness Strings (4:09)

Disc 2 (Sideways)
 Sideways One (5:21)
 Sideways Two (6:56)
 Sideways Three (5:52)
 Sideways Four (7:28)
 Sideways Five (5:36)
 Sideways Six (6:32)
 Sideways Seven (7:53)

References

The Hope Blister compilation albums
2005 compilation albums
4AD compilation albums